The 1973 New York City hostage incident was a hostage-taking and standoff between the New York City Police Department (NYPD) and four gunmen in Brooklyn, New York City, United States, lasting from January 19 to January 21, 1973. Over the course of the three-day-long incident, one police officer was killed, and two police officers and a suspect were injured.

During the standoff, the NYPD used crisis negotiation techniques pioneered by detective and psychologist Harvey Schlossberg to resolve the incident, resulting in the arrests of all four suspects and the safe release of the hostages.

Background
John and Al's Sports, Inc. was a sporting goods store on 927 Broadway Avenue, straddling the border of the Bushwick and Bedford–Stuyvesant neighborhoods of Brooklyn. The store, which opened in the 1930s, had been the victim of numerous robberies—"at least once every three months"—and its founder, Speilberger, was killed during one such robbery in 1967. By 1973, the store's owners were Samuel Rosenblum and Jerry Riccio, employees of Speilberger who took over after his death.

Harvey Schlossberg had recently been promoted from traffic officer to the NYPD's head psychologist due to his doctorate in clinical psychology. Schlossberg had disdain for the NYPD's hostage rescue tactics at the time, which focused on close-quarters combat and apprehending or killing the suspects with violent force, with hostages secondary to defeating the hostage-takers. Schlossberg believed in a more introspective approach, believing that forming a bond with the suspects, analyzing their psyche, attempting to find solutions to the suspects' problems, and focusing on freeing the hostages could result in a peaceful resolution. Though he promoted keeping the scene confined to one area, he was open to the possibility of letting the suspects go if necessary, reasoning that "you can always catch the criminals later".

A day prior to the incident, seven Hanafi Sunni Muslims were murdered by members of the Black Mafia in Washington, D.C.. The killings occurred after Hamaas Abdul Khaalis, an associate of Malcolm X, seemingly turned away from the Nation of Islam. The perpetrators of the hostage-taking, themselves Sunni Muslims, would later claim in court that the massacre was what spurred them to acquire weapons in the event they had to defend themselves from a similar attack.

Incident 
On January 19, 1973, at around 5:00 pm, four African American Sunni Muslims—Shulab Abdur Raheem, 24; Dawd A. Rahman, 22; Yusef Abdallah Almussadig, 23; and Salih Ali Abdullah, 26— entered John and Al's and began browsing the store's merchandise. After a few minutes, they suddenly drew a sawed-off shotgun and three handguns and demanded firearms and ammunition for either a "holy crusade" or self-defense.

The NYPD was alerted to the robbery by the store's silent alarm and a Bushwick High School student who managed to escape. When police arrived, the suspects and the responding officers exchanged fire. In the ensuing shootout, Officer Stephen R. Gilroy, 29, was shot in the head and killed while taking a position behind an elevated train pillar. Two other police officers were wounded, and Almussadig was shot in the abdomen.

The suspects then took 12 hostages inside the store. What followed was a 47 hour standoff between the NYPD and the suspects. The NYPD deployed the Emergency Service Unit, an M113 armored personnel carrier nicknamed "Annie" or "The Tank", and dozens of officers (including Schlossberg) to surround the store; however, police did not fire again for the rest of the standoff, instead using crisis negotiation techniques to reason with the suspects and coerce them into releasing the hostages and surrendering. After the suspects ripped out the store's phone lines, several religious leaders, including a Muslim minister, as well as the suspects' family members, were sent to communicate with the suspects using a megaphone from "Annie", which was positioned close to the store.

On January 20, three hostages were released in exchange for medical supplies to treat Almussadig's injuries; these were given to the suspects by Dr. Thomas W. Matthews and a nurse, who were allowed to enter the store to give them the supplies. They were also given a megaphone and a walkie-talkie, which they would later use to order sandwiches and cigarettes. Matthews also established a working phone line between the NYPD and the store.

On January 21, Riccio convinced the suspects to leave the remaining hostages in a specific corner of the store where they would supposedly be safer; unbeknownst to the suspects, this corner contained a half-inch plasterboard wall that hid a stairwell leading to the roof of the store. While the suspects left them unattended to investigate what they believed to be footsteps in a neighboring furniture store, the hostages broke through the wall and climbed the stairs to the roof, allowing them to escape. With the hostages secured and no longer a factor, the NYPD prepared for the possibility that the suspects would attempt to fight to the death, as they had planned to previously; however, around 4:55 pm, after a brief prayer, the suspects exited the store and surrendered, carrying Almussadig out on a stretcher. Almussadig was taken to Kings County Hospital Center to treat his injuries.

Aftermath

Trial 
In 1974, their court case went to the New York Supreme Court in Brooklyn. The defense contended that the four men held up the store to acquire weapons for self-defense because they feared attacks by their rivals, the Black Muslims. Their fears were spurred by the killings of seven Sunni Muslims in Washington, D.C. the day prior. The defendants argued the standoff only transpired because they were "forced to defend [themselves] from an unprovoked attack by police officers". A jury found them guilty of 41 counts, including murder, kidnapping, and robbery. Raheem was convicted for Gilroy's murder.

In 2008, Raheem expressed his regrets for the events of the incident, stating in a parole hearing, "I wish there was some way I could go back to the moment I decided to enter the store ... I'm not an animal. I understand the pain I caused."

In 1998, the New York State Division of Parole released Almussudug. The public was not made aware he had been released when he died in 2003. In 2010, Raheem was released on parole from the Eastern Correctional Facility in Napanoch, New York, and is currently a social worker. Rahman was released in 2019. In October 2020, Salih Abdullah died of a stroke he suffered at his 14th parole hearing. He was 71 years old and had served more than forty years in prison.

Legacy 
This hostage incident was a turning point in American law enforcement's approach to hostage situations. Instead of brute force, the police used psychology, firearm discipline, and patience to end the siege. These were techniques that were then codified in the NYPD's hostage negotiation training program, which began later in 1973.

The 2022 documentary Hold Your Fire by Stefan Forbes recounts the events of the incident and highlights the NYPD's hostage negotiation strategies.

Presently, the former site of John and Al's at 927 Broadway Avenue is Enrique's Unisex Salon.

See also
 1977 Washington, D.C., attack and hostage taking
 Black Mafia
 Hamaas Abdul Khaalis
 Wallace Fard Muhammad
 Zebra murders

References

1973 murders in the United States
1973 in New York City
Hostage taking in the United States
Bushwick, Brooklyn
1970s crimes in New York City
1970s in Brooklyn